Elizée Demankel is a Burkina Faso professional footballer, who plays as a midfielder for ASFA Yennenga and the Burkina Faso national football team.

International career
In January 2014, coach Brama Traore, invited him to be a part of the Burkina Faso squad for the 2014 African Nations Championship. The team was eliminated in the group stages after losing to Uganda and Zimbabwe and then drawing with Morocco.

References

Living people
Burkinabé footballers
2014 African Nations Championship players
Burkina Faso A' international footballers
ASFA Yennenga players
1989 births
Association football midfielders
21st-century Burkinabé people